This was the first edition of the tournament.

Bernard Tomic won the title after defeating Matthias Bachinger 4–6, 6–3, 7–6(7–3) in the final.

Seeds

Draw

Finals

Top half

Bottom half

References
Main Draw
Qualifying Draw

Rafa Nadal Open Banc Sabadell - Singles